Peter Westman (born 12 July 1972) is a retired Swedish football goalkeeper.

References

1972 births
Living people
Swedish footballers
Örebro SK players
Association football goalkeepers
Allsvenskan players
Place of birth missing (living people)